Gvarv is a village in Sauherad, Telemark, Norway.

Gvarv is famous for its  apples,   sweet cherries and sour cherries (as is the whole 
Sauherad municipality). Also (unusually for Norway) grapes and wine!

The Norwegian painter Erik Werenskiold painted a number of his famous rustic landscapes, such as Telemarksjenter ("Girls from Telemark"), in the vicinity of Gvarv.

Gvarv is also the host for the music festival Kartfestivalen and the apple festival Eplefest. Kartfestivalen is a pop/rock festival in the middle of August.

Sagavoll folkehøgskole (folk high school) is located in Gvarv.

The name
The Norse form of the name was Hvarf, the name is identical with the word hvarf, 'bend, bow' (here referring to the lower part of Gvarvelva River (Gvarv River) ).

Climate

References

External links 
 Sauherad municipality homepage
 Kartfestivalen home page
 Eplefest home page

Villages in Vestfold og Telemark